The 2017–18 CERH Women's European Cup is the 12th season of Europe's premier female club roller hockey competition organized by CERH.

Format

Fourteen teams joined the first round while title holders Voltregà got a wildcard for the quarterfinals.

Teams 
Fifteen teams from six federations joined the competition. The participants were confirmed on 19 September 2017.

Results
The draw was held at CERH headquarters in Lisbon, Portugal, on 23 September 2017.

Preliminary round
The first leg was played on 11 November and the second leg on 2 December 2017.

|}

Quarterfinals
The quarterfinals will be played on 20 January and 17 February 2018.

|}

Final Four
The Final Four was hosted in Lisbon, Portugal.

Semifinals

Final

See also
2017–18 CERH European League
2017–18 CERS Cup

References

External links
 

Rink Hockey European Female League
CERH
CERH